The Kookooligit Mountains are a volcanic mountain range on north-central St. Lawrence Island in the U.S. state of Alaska. The volcanic cones are composed primarily of alkali olivine basalts, olivine tholeiite, and basanite.

References

Landforms of Nome Census Area, Alaska
Shield volcanoes of the United States
Volcanoes of Alaska
Mountain ranges of Alaska
Mountains of Unorganized Borough, Alaska
Volcanoes of Unorganized Borough, Alaska
Polygenetic shield volcanoes
Pleistocene shield volcanoes